Disconeura soror is a moth of the family Erebidae first described by Walter Rothschild in 1917. It is found in Brazil.

References

Phaegopterina
Moths described in 1917